Sharp Airlines is a regional airline founded in Hamilton, Victoria, Australia in 1990. Sharp operates scheduled airline services in the southern states of Australia. Its main bases are Essendon Airport, Adelaide Airport and Launceston Airport. The airline also provides charter operations to regional Victoria and South Australia. The parent company, Sharp Aviation, has its main maintenance base at Launceston Airport. Sharp Airlines has no registered ICAO code.

History 
Commencing operations using the Piper PA-31-350 Chieftain, the airline has continued to grow, acquiring Fairchild Metro aircraft to replace the Chieftains, and adding Essendon Airport to the route network. In April 2008, it commenced services to Port Augusta from a new Adelaide Airport base of operations. Services from Adelaide to Port August were terminated in May 2017.

In October 2009, Sharp Airlines commenced a trial service connecting Adelaide with Portland and Avalon Airport. In January 2010, it became a permanent addition to the flight schedule but was subsequently terminated.

In October 2010, Sharp Airlines took over routes to Flinders Island from Launceston in Tasmania and Essendon Airport in Melbourne, Victoria from the previous operator, Airlines of Tasmania. In late 2011, twice-daily flights to King Island from Launceston via Wynyard started.

In May 2019, the airline announced that it would cease operating its Melbourne (Essendon Airport) - Warrnambool - Portland service after 30 June 2019, due to a lack of patronage.

In June 2019, the airline announced that it would commence operating a Melbourne (Essendon Airport) to Griffith, New South Wales service on 15 July 2019. This will be the first time that Sharp Airlines has operated an airline service to a destination in New South Wales. The service will operate daily (except Saturdays) with a flight time of one hour.

On 30 September 2020, Sharp Airlines started three return services per week between Hobart and King Island and Hobart and Flinders Island, allowing Tasmanians to travel within the State's borders directly from their capital city.

Destinations 

Sharp operates the following scheduled services.

From Flinders Island, Tasmania (Flinders Island Airport)
Launceston, Tasmania (Launceston Airport)
Melbourne, Victoria (Essendon Airport)
Hobart, Tasmania (Hobart Airport)
From King Island, Tasmania 
Launceston, Tasmania (Launceston Airport)
 Wynyard, Tasmania (Burnie Airport)
Hobart, Tasmania (Hobart Airport)
Melbourne, Victoria (Essendon Airport)

The airline also has a base at Adelaide Airport with 4-6 aircraft based there at any given time. Although there are no longer any regular passenger services out of Adelaide, the company operates frequent charters, mainly to mine sites throughout South Australia, some to Queensland and the Northern Territory. The scheduled services are operated using the airline's Metro III and Metro 23 aircraft. It also operates charter services using the Cessna 441 as well as the Metros throughout Australia.

Fleet 
As of April 2022 the Sharp Airlines fleet consists of the following aircraft:

See also
List of airlines of Australia

References

External links

Official Sharp Airlines Website
Sharp Airlines aircraft

Regional Aviation Association of Australia
Airlines established in 1990
Australian companies established in 1990